Alma Jane Valencia Escoto (born 18 October 1990) is a Mexican freestyle wrestler. In the 55 kg category, she won the silver medal at the 2015 Pan American Games, having finished seventh in 2011. She won three bronze medals at the Pan American Wrestling Championships in 2010, 2011 and 2013. She also won a silver and gold medal at the 2010 and 2014 Central American and Caribbean Games respectively, both in the 55 kg category.

Valencia qualified for the 2020 Summer Olympics in the women's freestyle 57 kg category at the 2020 Pan American Qualification Tournament in Ottawa, Canada.

In October 2021, she was eliminated in her first match in the women's 57 kg event at the 2021 World Wrestling Championships in Oslo, Norway.

She won the silver medal in her event at the 2022 Pan American Wrestling Championships held in Acapulco, Mexico.

Personal life
Valencia is in a relationship with Puerto Rican wrestler Jaime Espinal. Their first daughter Joy Espinal Valencia was born on 31 May 2017.

References

External links
 

1990 births
Living people
Mexican female sport wrestlers
Olympic wrestlers of Mexico
Wrestlers at the 2020 Summer Olympics
Pan American Games medalists in wrestling
Pan American Games silver medalists for Mexico
Wrestlers at the 2011 Pan American Games
Medalists at the 2015 Pan American Games
Wrestlers at the 2015 Pan American Games
Competitors at the 2010 Central American and Caribbean Games
Competitors at the 2014 Central American and Caribbean Games
Central American and Caribbean Games medalists in wrestling
People from Zapopan, Jalisco
Sportspeople from Jalisco